The 1994–95 NCAA football bowl games concluded the 1994 NCAA Division I-A football season. In the third and final year of the Bowl Coalition era, the Coalition failed to achieve its goal of a true national championship game between the nation's top two teams. The Coalition's designated championship game for the 1994 season, the 1995 Orange Bowl, pitted No. 1 Nebraska against No. 3 Miami (FL), while No. 2 Penn State was tied to the Rose Bowl as a member of the Big Ten Conference. Nebraska defeated Miami in the Orange Bowl, and was named national champions by both the AP Poll and Coaches Poll, while Penn State defeated Oregon in the Rose Bowl and did not claim a national championship.

A total of 19 bowl games were played between December 14, 1994 and January 2, 1995 by 38 bowl-eligible teams. The number of bowls remained unchanged from the previous year.

Non-Coalition bowls

Bowl Coalition bowls

References